MusE is computer software, a sequencer for Musical Instrument Digital Interface (MIDI) and audio, with recording and editing abilities. It was originally written by Werner Schweer and now is developed by the MusE development team. It is free software released under GPL-2.0-or-later.

MusE aims to be a complete multitrack virtual studio for Linux. As of 2020, it has no support under other platforms as it relies on Linux-only technologies, such as Advanced Linux Sound Architecture (ALSA). It also supports the Linux Audio Session Handler (LASH).

From version 0.7 on, its music notation abilities were removed to MuseScore. However, they return in 2.0.

From version 2.2 MusE supports the LV2 audio plugin format and the formerly supported Linux Audio Developer's Simple Plugin API (LADSPA), Disposable Soft Synth Interface (DSSI), and Virtual Studio Technology (VST).

From version 4.0 a redesigned user interface has been added.

References

External links 
 

Audio editing software that uses Qt
Audio recording software
Audio software with JACK support
Digital audio workstation software
Free audio editors
Free audio software
Free music software
Music software for Linux